Birieux is a commune in the Ain department in eastern France.

Geography
The Chalaronne forms part of the commune's northwestern border.

History
Birieux is first mentioned in the 12th century as a priory dependent on the abbey of l'Île Barbe à Lyon.

In the Middle Ages, Birieux was a possession of the lords of Thoire-Villars.

In 1789, the commune was included in the canton of Meximieux.

Population

Economy
The region is primarily agricultural, producing grain and cattle.

See also
Communes of the Ain department
Dombes

References

External links

La Dombes and the city of Birieux

Communes of Ain